Grafton is a suburb of Auckland, New Zealand. The suburb is named for the Duke of Grafton, a patron of the first Governor of New Zealand, William Hobson, and the grandfather of a subsequent Governor, Robert FitzRoy. Once known as 'Grafton Heights', denoting its history as a well-off suburb in Auckland's earliest decades.

Description
The suburb is characterised by its many historic buildings, many of them essentially unchanged from the early decades of the 20th century. While the extents of the suburb have shrunk with the motorway and arterial road construction of the middle 20th century,  the remaining smaller suburb thus has a highly cohesive structure, which is recognised, for example, in the residential zoning which discourages demolition of existing buildings.

Grafton has a local resident's association, abbreviated as the GRA. The menswear fashion brand and retail chain Barkers has its head office in Grafton.

Demographics

Grafton had a population of 1,686 at the 2018 New Zealand census, a decrease of 192 people (−10.2%) since the 2013 census, and a decrease of 36 people (−2.1%) since the 2006 census. There were 558 households, comprising 849 males and 840 females, giving a sex ratio of 1.01 males per female. The median age was 29.2 years (compared with 37.4 years nationally), with 117 people (6.9%) aged under 15 years, 771 (45.7%) aged 15 to 29, 660 (39.1%) aged 30 to 64, and 135 (8.0%) aged 65 or older.

Ethnicities were 60.5% European/Pākehā, 7.7% Māori, 3.9% Pacific peoples, 34.2% Asian, and 4.6% other ethnicities. People may identify with more than one ethnicity.

The percentage of people born overseas was 48.0, compared with 27.1% nationally.

Although some people chose not to answer the census's question about religious affiliation, 53.0% had no religion, 31.5% were Christian, 0.4% had Māori religious beliefs, 3.4% were Hindu, 2.3% were Muslim, 2.5% were Buddhist and 2.7% had other religions.

Of those at least 15 years old, 720 (45.9%) people had a bachelor's or higher degree, and 48 (3.1%) people had no formal qualifications. The median income was $33,200, compared with $31,800 nationally. 348 people (22.2%) earned over $70,000 compared to 17.2% nationally. The employment status of those at least 15 was that 816 (52.0%) people were employed full-time, 279 (17.8%) were part-time, and 54 (3.4%) were unemployed.

Education

Landmarks

 Grafton Bridge: Spanning Grafton Gully and connecting the Auckland CBD with Grafton and parts further east this was the largest piece of Civil Engineering in New Zealand. When it was completed in 1910 it was the largest reinforced concrete arched bridge in the world, spanning almost 300 metres.
 Basley-Bush House (aka. Rothesay Private Hotel), 123 Grafton Road, was built c. 1882 for George William Basley (1846-1919), Mayor of Parnell 1906-1909. Featuring Italianate design to the windows and detailing of the building, with its distinctive faceted pyramidal roof bay, ornate chimneys and modillions it is the sole remnant of the Victorian-Edwardian era on Grafton Road. During and after the construction of Grafton Bridge in 1908-1910 the house was the residence of the City Engineer Walter Ernest Bush who was supervising the completion of the bridge. After being derelict for many years, the house has been recently restored from its decrepit state by Falling Apple Charitable Trust volunteers and currently operates as a café, art gallery and salon, namely Hum Salon.
 Auckland City Hospital: As early as 1842 this area was seen as an ideal spot for the colony's hospital; a sunny, north facing location a short distance from town but fairly isolated should there be an epidemic of any kind. The first buildings of the 1850s and 1860s were wooden and have long disappeared.  The main building was designed by Philip Herepath in 1878 in the Italianate style. It was demolished in the early 1960s and replaced by a 10 story modernist block which still stands on the hill. In the 1880s and 1890s new brick buildings of some size were built including the Costley block (now demolished) which was the legency of local benefactor Edward Costley. Close by are several other specialist blocks from before and after the first world war. In 2003, a new hospital was completed adjacent to the existing one. This new hospital amalgamated services of the old hospital's Acute Adult care, as well as Greenlane Hospital's Cardiothoracic services and National Women's Obstetric, Gynaecological and Neonatal services. Acute Paediatric services are delivered by the adjoining Starship Children's Hospital. By bringing all these services on to one campus, Auckland City Hospital gained the status of being the largest hospital in New Zealand.
 Huia Lodge - cnr Grafton and Park Road. In the 1960s a highrise Nurses residence replaced an Edwardian Mansion retaining several of the trees on the property.
 Auckland Medical School buildings. Designed in the brutalist style by (Stevenson & Turner architects) this complex dates from 1967 and is connected to the hospital by a pedestrian tunnel under the road. This is part of the Grafton Campus: The Medical School of the University of Auckland.
 Ernest Adams House - 72 Seafield View Road. Small 19th century cottage. The founder of the Baking Empire lived here. Note that although this end of the street is geographically closer to the central Post Office and the harbour the street numbering actually starts at the far end of the street. This is probably because Khyber Pass Road was created in the 1860s and Grafton Bridge only in the 1880s.
 Grafton Hall of Residence. Seafield View Road. 1971 high rise building built as ecumenical student Accommodation.
 Auckland Domain: This park, set aside by Governor William Hobson in the 1840s as a public domain, is one of the city's greatest assets. The Auckland War Memorial Museum and Cenotaph are perhaps its most dominant features.
 The Elliot Memorial Entrance Gates: These gates form the entrance to the Auckland Domain and are a fine example of the Art Deco style. William Elliot (1864-1934) was an Auckland businessman who was Chairman of the 1913 Auckland Exhibition, which was located in the Auckland Domain. The exhibition made a profit which was used to pay for the Wintergardens. Elliot donated marble statuary for the domain and the funds for these gates. Designed by Gummer and Ford architects, the structure is surmounted by a fine nude male bronze by Richard Gross.  The model was Alan Elliot (no relation to the patron) who had been a New Zealand medalist at the 1932 Olympics in Los Angeles.
 St Arvans. Cnr Carlton Gore Road and Park Road. Impressive wooden Edwardian mansion with distinctive turret. Built in 1910 as the home of Dr Arthur Challinor Purchas. Now run as a Backpackers.
 Huntly House - 16 Huntly Avenue. 19th century Italianate Masonry mansion built in 1876 for Francis White who married Charlotte, daughter of wealthy merchant & land owner C.J. Stone of Mount Albert who was reputably the first white baby born in New Zealand.
 La Roche Villa - cnr Glasgow Terrace. Brick villa designed by and built for Charles August La Roche in 1907. The red brick surfaces are not real bricks, the house is actually built of cheaper pale mottled brown bricks and then covered with red cement stucco with fake mortar lines. This was a fairly common practice in Auckland at the time as it gives the impression that the building is constructed of expensive imported red bricks from Britain at a fraction of the price.
 Grafton Mews 5 Glasgow Terrace. A striking 1970s development of hexagonal town houses. Built on the site of a Victorian house which was the location of the first drug raid in NZ concerning LSD.
 16 Carlton Gore Road. Until the 1980s this operated as a corner shop. In the 1940s this was the childhood home of Max Gimlett the NZ painter. For a while in the 1990s Don Binney, another NZ painter rented the former shop space as a studio.
 Outhwaite Park lies on the corner of Park Road and Carlton-Gore Road. This was the residence of Auckland's first Registrar of the Supreme Court, Thomas Outhwaite. From the 1840s onwards Outhwaite and his French wife Louise established a beautiful garden with many interesting specimen plants. In 1927 the last of their four children gave this land to the city as a park. The house does not survive but the basic layout of the grounds and many of the mature trees date from the Outhwaite family's time. The park gives an expansive view of Maungawhau / Mount Eden to the south with a view opposite of St Peter's College prominent on former Outhwaite land on its lower slopes.
 St Peter's College and Christian Brothers House, 1939–1944,  designed by William Henry Gummer, architect, extant; located on the other side of Khyber Pass Road from Outwaite Park. This Catholic Boys School is located on land especially gifted by the Outhwaite family.
 Former Methodist Training College - 140 Grafton Road, cnr Carlton Gore Road. Impressive brick Gothic building from the 1920s which replaced a number of earlier wooden buildings. Built between 1927 & 1928 to the designs of James Hodge White (1896-1970). In 1927 White joined forces with another Dunedin architect, Eric Miller (1896-1948) to form Miller & White. The firm became architects to the University of Otago, and won the National Design Competition for this building, the Auckland Residential Methodist College.
 Phoenix Gardens 135 Grafton Road. Highrise Apartment block built in the 1990s.
 In 1861 the Auckland Bowling Club in Stanley Street was established, with its fields in the Auckland Domain. This club still exists and was the first bowling club established in New Zealand.
 In 2011 Geologists located a 'forgotten volcano', Grafton Volcano, under the suburb. While it had long been known that the nearby Auckland Domain is a volcanic crater [approximately 50,000 years old], it is now apparent that most of the area on which the suburb of Grafton sits was on a slightly older volcanic crater, obscured by the later eruptions of the Domain Volcano.

Notable residents

During the late 1840s Chief Pōtatau Te Wherowhero resided in the Auckland Domain in a house provided for him by the Government, this house was located north of the Domain Ponds, between the Hospital and the southern entrance of what is now called Centennial Walk. Here he was visited by the then Governor, George Grey.

Gustavus von Tempsky (1828–1868) lived on Grafton Road in the early 1860s.

The early settler Outhwaite family resided in their Grafton house for nearly eighty five years.

Noted aviator Jean Batten stayed with her brother when he lived in Seafield View road during the 1930s (house demolished around 2006).

The painter Max Gimblett's family lived in Grafton in the 1940s and ran the shop on the corner of Carlton Gore and Seafield View Roads. In the 1990s the painter Don Binney rented the same shop as a studio space.

Pauline Kumeroa Kingi CNZM is a notable current resident.

References

The Heart of Colonial Auckland, 1865–1910. Terence Hodgson. Random Century NZ Ltd 1992.
Colonial Architecture In New Zealand. John Stacpoole.  A.H & A.W Reed 1976
Decently And In Order, The Centennial History of the Auckland City Council. G.W.A Bush. Collins 1971.
Auckland Through A Victorian Lens. William Main. Millwood Press 1977.
The Lively Capital, Auckland 1840–1865. Una Platts. Avon Fine Prints Limited New Zealand 1971.
 Grafton Heritage Trail, Grafton Residents Association 2005

External links
Photographs of Grafton held in Auckland Libraries' heritage collections.

Suburbs of Auckland
Waitematā Local Board Area
St Peter's College, Auckland